Angelos Digozis (born 19 March 1974) is a Greek professional football manager and former player, who is the current manager of Super League 2 club O.F. Ierapetra.

Throughout his career, he played a total of 435 matches in all divisions.  He holds a unique record in Greek football, having played in the first division with eight different clubs (Veria, Kavala, OFI, Aris, Ionikos, AEL, Skoda Xanthi and Panserraikos).

Playing career
Born in Pella, Digozis started his professional career with Apollon Kalamarias F.C. in 1994, going on to play for two more teams in the following five years, until reaching the top division with OFI Crete.

He helped OFI finish fourth in his first season, with the subsequent UEFA Cup qualification. In 2002, he moved to Cyprus, representing Olympiakos Nicosia for a brief period of time.

In the 2003 January transfer window, Digozis returned to his country with Aris Thessaloniki, being an essential midfield element as his club barely avoided top flight relegation in his first full season. He played for four clubs in the following five years, notably helping AEL F.C. win the 2007 domestic cup, defeating Panathinaikos F.C. at the Panthessaliko Stadium, for the second win in the tournament in the team's history.

In 2009, after suffering relegation from the top division with Panserraikos FC, 35-year-old Digozis resumed his career in the lower leagues.

Honours
AEL
 Greek Cup: 2006–07

References

External links
 Profile at Onsports.gr

1974 births
Living people
People from Pella (regional unit)
Greek footballers
Association football midfielders
Super League Greece players
Cypriot First Division players
Apollon Pontou FC players
Veria F.C. players
Kavala F.C. players
OFI Crete F.C. players
Aris Thessaloniki F.C. players
Ionikos F.C. players
Athlitiki Enosi Larissa F.C. players
Xanthi F.C. players
Panserraikos F.C. players
Anagennisi Karditsa F.C. players
Niki Volos F.C. players
Olympiakos Nicosia players
Greek expatriate footballers
Expatriate footballers in Cyprus
Trikala F.C. managers
Greek football managers
Footballers from Central Macedonia